Pierella luna, the Moon Satyr, is a species of butterfly of the family Nymphalidae. It is found in Mexico, Costa Rica, Colombia, Panama, Nicaragua, Ecuador, Belize, Brazil, Guatemala and Honduras.

Subspecies 
 Pierella luna luna (nominate)
 Pierella luna lesbia Staudinger, 1887
 Pierella luna pallida (Salvin & Godman, 1868) 
 Pierella luna rubecula Salvin & Godman, 1868

References

Butterflies described in 1793
Haeterini
Nymphalidae of South America